The Central Polynesian tropical moist forests is a tropical and subtropical moist broadleaf forests ecoregion in Polynesia. It includes the northern group of the Cook Islands, the Line Islands in Kiribati, and Johnston Atoll, Jarvis Island, Palmyra Atoll, and Kingman Reef which are possessions of the United States.

Geography
All the islands in the ecoregion are atolls, low islands of coral sand surrounding a central lagoon. There are eight inhabited and nine uninhabited atolls.

The northernmost, Johnston Atoll, is at 16°44′N latitude and 169°31′W longitude. The southernmost is Suwarrow at 13°16′S latitude and 163° 7′W longitude. 

Teraina, Tabuaeran, Kiritimati, Malden, Starbuck, Vostok, Caroline, and Flint are part of Kiribati. Kingman Reef, Palmyra Atoll, and Jarvis Island are territories of the United States. Kiritimati is the largest island in the 388 square kilometres.

Johnston Atoll lies northwest of the Line Islands and southwest of the Hawaiian Islands.

The Northern Cook Islands include the atolls of Pukapuka, Rakahanga, Manihiki, Penrhyn, and Suwarrow. The Southern Cook Islands are in the separate Cook Islands tropical moist forests ecoregion.

Climate
The climate of the islands is tropical. Temperature is warm year-round, with little seasonal variation. The southern and northern islands are within the trade wind belt, and regularly receive 1,500 and 3,000 mm of annual rainfall. The islands within 5° latitude of the equator receive less than 1000 mm annually, with periodic droughts.

Flora
The native vegetation on the more humid islands is tropical atoll forest. The characteristic species are common to coastal Indo-Pacific areas, and include the trees Pisonia grandis, Calophyllum inophyllum, Heliotropium foertherianum, Pandanus tectorius, Cordia subcordata, and Guettarda speciosa, and the shrubs Morinda citrifolia, Scaevola taccada, Suriana maritima, and Pemphis acidula.

The driest and lowest islands are covered with low plants, including the grass Lepturus repens and the creepers Tribulus cistoides or Portulaca lutea, with areas of Heliotropium foertherianum, Pemphis acidula, and Scaevola taccada scrub.

Fauna
The islands' vertebrate fauna is principally seabirds, which form large colonies on some islands. There are no native non-marine mammals or amphibians.

The sole passerine bird is the endemic bokikokiko (Acrocephalus aequinoctialis), a reed warbler found on Teraina, Tabuaeran, and Kiritimati. Kuhl's lorikeet (Vini kuhlii) is an endangered parrot found on Kiritimati and Teraina and on Rimatara in the Tubuai Islands to the southeast. Its range once included the Cook Islands.

Protected areas
A 2017 assessment found that 83% of the ecoregion is in protected areas. protected areas include:
 Kirimati wildlife refuge
 Suwarrow atoll
 Pacific Remote Islands Marine National Monument protects Kingman Reef, Johnson Atoll, Jarvis Island, and Palmyra Atoll.

References

External links

 Central Polynesian tropical moist forests (DOPA)
 Central Polynesian tropical moist forests (Encyclopedia of Earth)

Ecoregions of the Cook Islands
Ecoregions of Kiribati
Ecoregions of the United States
Oceanian ecoregions
Tropical and subtropical moist broadleaf forests